Sack Island is a rocky island,  long, lying  east of the south end of Holl Island, in the Windmill Islands. First mapped from aerial photographs taken by U.S. Navy Operation Highjump in February 1947. Named by the Advisory Committee on Antarctic Names (US-ACAN) for Norman F. Sack who served as photographer's mate with the central task force of U.S. Navy Operation Highjump, 1946–47, and assisted Operation Windmill parties in obtaining photographic coverage of this area in January 1948.

See also 
 List of antarctic and sub-antarctic islands

External links

Windmill Islands